The Lorenzo S. Coffin Burial Plot (also known as Willowedge Cemetery and Coffin Cemetery) is a historic structure located northwest of Fort Dodge, Iowa, United States.  Initially, the various members of the Coffin family had individual grave markers, but after Lorenzo Coffin's death, they were incorporated into a concrete wall.  The surrounding graves are those of non-family members.  The Coffin family home was originally to the west of the grave site.  It was listed on the National Register of Historic Places in 1977.

References

External links
 

Buildings and structures in Webster County, Iowa
National Register of Historic Places in Webster County, Iowa